Pierre Finaly (1889–1937) was a French stage and film actor.

Finaly was born into a family with Hungarian Jewish roots and died in Paris.

Selected filmography
 The Darling of Paris (1931)
 Maurin of the Moors (1932)
 Companion Wanted (1932)
 Billeting Order (1932)
 Heart of Paris (1932)
 Poliche (1934)
 Gold in the Street (1934)
 Jeanne (1934)
 Antonia (1935)
 Disk 413 (1936)
 The Brighton Twins (1936)
 The Tender Enemy (1936)
 Culprit (1937)
 The Red Dancer (1937)

References

Bibliography
 Goble, Alan. The Complete Index to Literary Sources in Film. Walter de Gruyter, 1999.

External links

1889 births
1937 deaths
French male stage actors
French male film actors
French male silent film actors
20th-century French male actors
Male actors from Paris
Jewish French male actors